Frandy Montrévil (born 14 January 1982) is a former Haitian footballer. He won the Ligue Haïtienne as well as its Ballon d'Or for best player with Valencia FC in Léogâne. He also played for the Haiti national football team. Montrévil retired in 2013.

References

External links

1982 births
Living people
Haitian footballers
Haiti international footballers
Association football goalkeepers
People from Cap-Haïtien
Ligue Haïtienne players
2013 CONCACAF Gold Cup players
AS Capoise players
Don Bosco FC players
Valencia FC (Haiti) players